Ladyva (born Vanessa Sabrina Gnaegi; also known as Vanessa G; born 8 December 1988) is a Swiss musician, boogie woogie, blues and jazz pianist, singer and composer.

Musical career 
Ladyva started playing the piano when she was 14. She was inspired by the music of the great masters of boogie woogie. Two years later she began performing, together with her brother Pascal Silva. In 2014, Ladyva appeared at several boogie woogie festivals in Germany.

Ladyva was invited to perform at Jerry Lee Lewis' 80th Birthday/Farewell U.K. Tour at the London Palladium and the Clyde Auditorium in Glasgow in September 2015. On 16 October 2015 she performed live on The Late Late Show on RTÉ One in Ireland. In November she toured through Europe, appearing on TV shows in Bulgaria, including Slavi's Show and the election of Miss Bulgaria. In London (Boisdale, Canary Wharf) she performed at the 'Cigar Awards' with guests including Burt Reynolds and Jonathan Ross.

In May 2016, she was invited to perform at the Boogie Woogie & Blues Spectacular hosted by Jools Holland with other boogie woogie pianists such as Axel Zwingenberger and Ben Waters, and stride pianist Neville Dickie. On 12 December she performed again at the Cigar Awards 2016 with guests including Charlie Sheen and Kelsey Grammer. In 2016 performances at festivals in Switzerland and abroad (France, Spain, Germany) followed, together with Silvan Zingg. At the International Boogie Woogie Festival in Lugano, they presented their first joint four-handed CD "Beloved Boogie Woogie" on 22 April 2017.

In August 2017 and 2022 she was invited to perform at the world's biggest Boogie Woogie Festival at Laroquebrou in France.

On 13 September 2017 in London, Ladyva received the award as 'Best Boogie Woogie Pianist 2017' at the Boisdale Music Awards hosted by Jools Holland, having just released her third Album '8 to the Bar'.

In November 2017 Ladyva performed at Beatles Symphonic at the London Coliseum singing the song "Something" accompanied by the London Concert Orchestra along with stars including Bonnie Tyler.

In 2018 she performed live on the British TV show "Loose Women" on ITV. Later that year she attended again the Boogie-Woogie and Blues Spectacular hosted by Jools Holland, this time with invites such as "Dr. House" alias Hugh Laurie.

She also attended lots of Jazz & Boogie-Festivals all around the globe such as: Caval’Air Jazz & Festival International de Boogie Woogie de Laroquebrou (France) Jazzfestival Tingen, The Hamburg Boogie Woogie Connection & The Boogie Woogie Congress Essen (Germany), The International Jazzfestival Bansko (Bulgaria), International Boogie Nights Thun, Blues Festival Basel JazzAscona, Jazzmeile Kreuzlingen (Switzerland), Boogie & Blues Reunion Terrasssa (Spain), The London International Festival of Boogie Woogie (UK), and many more.

Her 2020 piece "Quarantine Boogie" reached over 100,000 views on YouTube in less than five days.

In 2021 she released a single, "Ladyva's Stomp".

28 September 2022: Ladyva received the award as 'Boogie Woogie Artist Of The Year' at the Boisdale Music Awards hosted by Jools Holland.

In December 2022 she performed with Kool & The Gang at the great Pyramids of Giza in Egypt. 

, her YouTube channel has over 55 million views.

Achievements 
 2017 Boisdale Music Awards hosted by Jools Holland: "Best Boogie Woogie Pianist 2017"
 2022 YouTube Creator Award Silver Play Button "Ladyva - for passing 100'000 subscribers"
 2022 Boisdale Music Awards hosted by Jools Holland: "Boogie Woogie Artist Of The Year"

Discography 
 2009: Vanessa G – The Boogie Woogie Lady
 2013: Ladyva – 2nd Cut
 2016: The New Orleans Experience – Jazz Ascona Festival Sampler-CD
 2016: Ladyva & Silvan Zingg – Beloved Boogie Woogie
 2017: Ladyva – 8 to the Bar
 2021: Ladyva – Ladyva's Stomp

References

External links 
  
 

Living people
1988 births
21st-century pianists
Swiss composers
Swiss jazz pianists
Swiss singers
Swiss women pianists
21st-century women pianists